The Aftenposten Gold Medal is one of the highest awards that are awarded within Norwegian sport. The Gold Medal was instituted in 1933 by Sport magazine. The following year, in 1934, it was taken over by Morgenbladet, and named Morgenbladet gold medal.

History
From 1993 to 1996, called the price Foundation Morgenbladet gold medal. From 1997, Aftenposten over award, and the award was renamed Aftenposten gold medal.

 Aftenposten Gold Medal awarded to the best Norwegian sports-person in the calendar year, decided by the committee.
 The medal can not be assigned team, but to a single team sport athlete if the committee finds it justified.
 The gold medal can only be distributed once to the same person.
 If two or more candidates for committee opinion are equal:  
 Shall have regard to the importance of sports achievement has, or can obtain, for the particular sport.
 The Committee shall as far as possible avoid awarding two medals in the same year.
 The Committee may, if no candidates are worthy, neglect and distribute gold medal a year.
 If gold medal one year no dividend shall not for that reason be awarded two Gold Medals in the following year.
 The Committee shall consist of three or five people with rock-solid knowledge of Norwegian sport.
 The committee's recommendation to the awarding of Gold Medal is supreme.

The Committee has for several years passed by Aftenposten sports commentator Bertil Valderhaug (Jury Chairman), sports journalist and Per Jorsett and sports leader Hroar Elvenes, both from Norwegian Sports Leader - Veterans. 

Cross-country skier Sigurd Vestad became the first recipient of the award in 1933 for its superior victory femmila in Holmenkollen that year. Alpine skier Inger Bjørnbakken was in 1958 the first female recipient of the medal. She got it after here gold in Slalom World Championships in Alpine skiing.

In ten cases the jury have not clearly distinguish between the best and awarded the medal to two achievements. The first time, in 1947, there were performances of Leif Hveem and His Aasnes which could not be separated. Since the price, it has been awarded to two performances in 1955, 1957, 1965, 1987, 1989, 1992, 1993, 1994 and 1997. Four times the price has been awarded achievements made by teams, or couples. Double scull consisting of brothers Alf Hansen and Frank Hansen won in 1975. World Championship title to K2 to Einar Rasmussen and Olaf Søyland K2 won in 1979. The dancers Tone Nyhagen and Knut Saeborg won in 1987 and in 1989 Rolf Thorsen and Lars Bjønness won the goldmedal after their  World Cup victory in double scull.
In 2012 the medal was (for the first time) awarded to a Paralympic athlete, as Sarah Louise Rung got it after here gold at 200 meters free during the Paralympic Summer Games 2012. [2]
The biggest sports by champions are athletics (15), cross country (13) and skating (9). Among clubs are Hamar IL mostwinning with five awards. Three athletes from Bærums Skiklubb has won the medal, while a further eight clubs have two athletes with medal.

Gallery of some of the winners

References

External links
Aftenpostens gullmedalje – prisvinnere i Store norske leksikon

Sport in Norway